Dumbrăvița is a commune in Sîngerei District, Moldova. It is composed of three villages: Bocancea-Schit, Dumbrăvița and Valea lui Vlad. Valea lui Vlad is a former Jewish agricultural colony.

References

Communes of Sîngerei District
Former Jewish agricultural colonies of Bessarabia